Vincent Mendy (born 4 May 1983 in Dakar, Senegal) is a French professional basketball player.

Club career
He played in French professional championship from 2002 to 2010.

References

1983 births
Living people
French men's basketball players
Nanterre 92 players
Centers (basketball)